RFA Plumleaf (A78) was a Leaf-class support tanker of the Royal Fleet Auxiliary of the United Kingdom.

Launched on 29 March 1960, she measured 12,692 gross registered tons, with a length of 560 feet, a beam of 72 feet 1 inch and a draught of 30 feet  inch. She was powered by a 6-cylinder engine giving the ship a top speed of 15 knots.

She saw service during the Falklands War. Plumleaf was decommissioned in 1986, arriving at Kaohsiung for demolition on 17 December 1986.

References

Plumleaf (A78)
Plumleaf (A78)
Plumleaf
1960 ships
Ships built on the River Blyth